Klocksin is a municipality  in the Mecklenburgische Seenplatte district, in Mecklenburg-Western Pomerania, Germany.

References